Henri "Han" Cox (21 May 1899 – 18 March 1979) was a Dutch rower. He competed at the 1928 Summer Olympics in Amsterdam with the men's double sculls where they were eliminated in the quarter-final.

References

1899 births
1979 deaths
Dutch male rowers
Olympic rowers of the Netherlands
Rowers at the 1928 Summer Olympics
Sportspeople from Arnhem
European Rowing Championships medalists